Somerset is a historic home located near Powhatan, Powhatan County, Virginia. It was built in three sections, with the earliest dated to about 1775.  It is a -story, four bay frame dwelling with a Hall and chamber plan.  Also on the property are the contributing well, corn crib, and cemetery.

It was added to the National Register of Historic Places in 2006.

References

Houses on the National Register of Historic Places in Virginia
Federal architecture in Virginia
Houses completed in 1775
Houses in Powhatan County, Virginia
National Register of Historic Places in Powhatan County, Virginia